Dasyuris fulminea is a species of moth in the family Geometridae. It was first described by Alfred Philpott and is endemic to New Zealand. It has been observed in the regions of the West Coast, Fiordland and Otago. Adults are day flying and are on the wing from December until February.

Taxonomy 
D. fulminea was first described by Alfred Philpott in 1915 using a male specimen collected by George Howes on Bold Peak in Otago in February. George Hudson discussed and illustrated this species in his 1928 book The butterflies and moths of New Zealand. The holotype specimen is held at Te Papa.

Description 

Philpott originally described this species as follows:
This species is similar in appearance to Dasyuris callicrena but can be distinguished as the lines on the forewings differ between the two species and the cilia of D. fulminea are only of one colour unlike those of D. callicrena.

Distribution 
This species is endemic to New Zealand. Along with the type locality of Bold Peak, this species has also been observed in Fiordland as well as in the mountains in the West Coast.

Behaviour 
The adults of this species are day flying moths and are on the wing from December to February.

References

Larentiinae
Moths of New Zealand
Moths described in 1915
Endemic fauna of New Zealand
Taxa named by Alfred Philpott
Endemic moths of New Zealand